ICFAI University, Nagaland, formerly known by its full name Institute of Chartered Financial Analysts of India University (Nagaland), is a private university located in Sovima, Nagaland, India. The university was established in 2006 under the Institute of Chartered Financial Analysts of India University, (Nagaland) Act 2006 and renamed in 2015 under the ICFAI University, Nagaland (Amendment) Act, 2014.

C.P. Alexander was the Vice-Chancellor (VC) of the university from 2016 until his death in 2019. Arun Kumar Varma was appointed VC in April 2021.

References

External links

2009 establishments in Nagaland
Educational institutions established in 2009
Universities and colleges in Nagaland
Private universities in India